Oʼodham (pronounced ) or Papago-Pima is a Uto-Aztecan language of southern Arizona and northern Sonora, Mexico,  where the Tohono Oʼodham (formerly called the Papago) and Akimel Oʼodham (traditionally called Pima) reside. In 2000 there were estimated to be approximately 9,750 speakers in the United States and Mexico combined, although there may be more due to underreporting.

It is the 10th most-spoken indigenous language in the United States, the 3rd most-spoken indigenous language in Arizona after Western Apache and Navajo. It is the third-most spoken language in Pinal County, Arizona, and the fourth-most spoken language in Pima County, Arizona.

Approximately 8% of Oʼodham speakers in the US speak English "not well" or "not at all", according to results of the 2000 Census. Approximately 13% of Oʼodham speakers in the US were between the ages of 5 and 17, and among the younger Oʼodham speakers, approximately 4% were reported as speaking English "not well" or "not at all".

Dialects
The Oʼodham language has a number of dialects.
 Tohono Oʼodham
 Cukuḍ Kuk
 Gigimai
 Huhuʼula (Huhuwoṣ)
 Totoguanh
 Akimel Oʼodham
 Eastern Gila
 Kohadk
 Salt River
 Western Gila
 Hia C-ed Oʼodham
 ?

Due to the paucity of data on the linguistic varieties of the Hia C-eḍ Oʼodham, this section currently focuses on the Tohono Oʼodham and Akimel Oʼodham dialects only.

The greatest lexical and grammatical dialectal differences are between the Tohono Oʼodham (or Papago) and the Akimel Oʼodham (or Pima) dialect groupings. Some examples:

There are other major dialectal differences between northern and southern dialects, for example:

The Cukuḍ Kuk dialect has null in certain positions where other Tohono Oʼodham dialects have a bilabial:

Morphology
Oʼodham is an agglutinative language, where words use suffix complexes for a variety of purposes with several morphemes strung together.

Phonology

Oʼodham phonology has a typical Uto-Aztecan inventory distinguishing 21 consonants and 5 vowels.

Consonants

The retroflex consonants are apical postalveolar.

Vowels

Most vowels distinguish two degrees of length: long and short, and some vowels also show extra-short duration (voicelessness).

   "Seri"
   "permission"
   "you"
   "I don't know", "who knows?"

Papago  is pronounced  in Pima.

Additionally, in common with many northern Uto-Aztecan languages, vowels and nasals at end of words are devoiced. Also, a short schwa sound, either voiced or unvoiced depending on position, is often interpolated between consonants and at the ends of words.

Allophony and distribution

 Extra short  is realized as voiceless  and devoices preceding obstruents:   →  "jackrabbit".
  is a fricative  before unrounded vowels:  .
However, there are several Spanish loanwords where  occurs:  "number". Similarly, for the most part  and  appear before low vowels while  and  before high vowels, but there are exceptions to both, often in Spanish loanwords:  "wine", TO weco / AO veco ("[de]bajo") "under".

Orthography

There are two orthographies commonly used for the Oʼodham language: Alvarez–Hale and Saxton. The Alvarez–Hale orthography is officially used by the Tohono Oʼodham Nation and the Salt River Pima–Maricopa Indian Community, and is used in this article, but the Saxton orthography is also common and is official in the Gila River Indian Community. It is relatively easy to convert between the two, the differences between them being largely no more than different graphemes for the same phoneme, but there are distinctions made by Alvarez–Hale not made by Saxton.

The Saxton orthography does not mark word-initial  or extra-short vowels. Final  generally corresponds to Hale–Alvarez  and final  to Hale–Alvarez :

 Hale–Alvarez  vs. Saxton   "cottontail rabbit"
 Hale–Alvarez  vs. Saxton   "I"

Disputed spellings

There is some disagreement among speakers as to whether the spelling of words should be only phonetic or whether etymological principles should be considered as well.

Grammar

Syntax

Oʼodham has relatively free word order within clauses; for example, all of the following sentences mean "the boy brands the pig":

 
 
 
 
 
 

In principle, these could also mean "the pig brands the boy", but such an interpretation would require an unusual context.

Despite the general freedom of sentence word order, Oʼodham is fairly strictly verb-second in its placement of the auxiliary verb (in the above sentences, it is ):

  "I am working"
 but  "I am not working", not **pi cipkan ʼañ

Verbs
Verbs are inflected for aspect (imperfective , perfective ), tense (future imperfective ), and number (plural ). Number agreement displays absolutive behavior: verbs agree with the number of the subject in intransitive sentences, but with that of the object in transitive sentences:

  "the boy is working"
  "the boys are working"
  "the boy is branding the pig"
  "the boys are branding the pig"
  "the boy is branding the pigs"

The main verb agrees with the object for person ( in the above example), but the auxiliary agrees with the subject:  "I am branding the pigs".

Nouns
Three numbers are distinguished in nouns: singular, plural, and distributive, though not all nouns have distinct forms for each. Most distinct plurals are formed by reduplication and often vowel loss plus other occasional morphophonemic changes, and distributives are formed from these by gemination of the reduplicated consonant:

  "dog",  "dogs",  "dogs (all over)"
  "car",  "cars",  "cars (all over)"
  "cat",  "cats"

Adjectives
Oʼodham adjectives can act both attributively modifying nouns and predicatively as verbs, with no change in form.

  "This water is cold"
  "I like cold water"

Sample text
The following is an excerpt from Oʼodham Piipaash Language Program:  ("Roadrunner"). It exemplifies the Salt River dialect.

In Saxton orthography:

See also

 Tohono Oʼodham
 Pima Bajo language

References

External links

Oʼodham Swadesh vocabulary list (Wiktionary)
Papago – English Dictionary
Tohono 'O'odham-English Dictionary, Volume I and Volume II
The 'O'odham Texts - Includes stories with phonetic transcription, audio, and translation created by linguist Madeleine Mathiot with Jose Pancho and others.

  

Agglutinative languages
Piman languages
Languages of the United States
Indigenous languages of Mexico
Indigenous languages of Arizona
Indigenous languages of the Southwestern United States
Indigenous languages of the North American Southwest
Tohono O'odham culture
Verb-second languages